The Hottentot Proclamation, also known as the Hottentot Code, the Caledon Proclamation, or the Caledon Code, was a decree issued by governor of the Cape Colony the Earl of Caledon on 1 November 1809 to restrict the mobility of Khoikhoi (frequently referred to as "Hottentots", hence the name) in the Cape Colony. Established to assist Dutch land owners in controlling their mobility of their enslaved workforce (which mostly consisted of Khoikhoi labourers), the decree was a first in a series of colonial laws designed to curtail the rights of First people living in the Cape Colony.

The proclamation was repealed in 1828.

Background 
The Hottentot Proclamation was implemented during a period of rising abolitionist sentiment among the general public in Britain, which had led in part to the passage of the Slave Trade Act 1807 through the British Parliament. Thus, governor of the Cape Colony the Earl of Caledon ensured the decree appeared to be different from the slave codes passed by the Dutch colonialists which had previously controlled the Cape Colony. Written contracts had to be registered documenting the employment of Khoekhoe labourers for periods of one month or longer. The decree also claimed to provide a safeguard against the mistreatment of Khoekhoe labourers at the hands of Afrikaner land owners, making it compulsory that they were paid for any services that they provided.

According to the Apprenticeship of Servants Proclamation of 1812, in support of the Hottentot Proclamation, white settlers could apprentice and employ a Coloured child without paying them from the age of eight to eighteen years if the child was an orphan, destitute or grew up on the employer's property.

Implementation

Earl of Caledon imposed the Caledon Code in his capacity as the first Governor of the Cape Colony after the Battle of Blaauwberg in 1806. The eastern and north-eastern districts of the Cape Colony were most affected by the declaration since most of the Khoikhoi population was based in these areas.

It stated that the Khoikhoi were to have a “fixed place of abode” and that they could not travel freely, requiring a passport if they were found outside of their stipulated area. This prevented them from moving away from farms in which they worked as slaves unless their passes were signed by their employer. If asked to produce a pass by a white settler, they were to present the document verifying that they had permission from their employer to be away from home.

Repeal
Ordinance No. 50 of 1828 repealed the Proclamation in that year.

The movement to issue Ordinance No. 50 was led by Dr John Philip, who continually worked against the discriminatory treatment of indigenous South Africans, and, together with British missionaries protested the Hottentot Proclamation. Even while he was back in Britain, from 1826 to 1828, Philip fought for the emancipation of tribes in the Cape.  Ordinance No.50 freed the Coloured slaves from the pass system while Black people in accordance to the Ordinance No. 49 of 1828 were still issued them passes for the sole purpose of seeking work.

All the slaves living in British colonies were to be freed after serving what is described as a period of apprenticeship, which only ended in 1838 in the Cape Colony.

Aftermath
The repeal of the code would later set the stage for the abolition of slavery in all parts of the British empire via the Emancipation Act of 1833.

See also 
 Parliament of the Cape of Good Hope
 1809 in South Africa

References

Cape Colony law
History of South Africa
1809 in the Cape Colony
1809 in law
Legal history of South Africa